This is a list of episodes of The Fall and Rise of Reginald Perrin and its follow-up series The Legacy of Reginald Perrin.

Series 1: (1976)

Series 2: (1977)

Series 3: (1978–79)

Christmas special: 1982

The Legacy of Reginald Perrin: 1996

External links
 List of Episodes at leonardrossiter.com
 The Fall and Rise of Reginald Perrin BBC episode list
 
 
 List of The Fall and Rise of Reginald Perrin Episodes at epguides

Lists of British sitcom episodes